Shelby is a 2014 Canadian Christmas comedy film directed by Brian K. Roberts and starring John Paul Ruttan, Chevy Chase, Tom Arnold and Rob Schneider as the voice of the titular dog.

Plot

Cast
Rob Schneider as Shelby (voice)
Tom Arnold as Doug the Dog Catcher
Jennifer Gibson as Rich Divorcee
Riley Blue Roberts as Spoiled Kid
Jefferson Brown as Edward Parker
Natalie Lisinska as Lilly Parker
John Paul Ruttan as Jake Parker
Will Jester as Brent Parker
Chevy Chase as Grandpa Geoffrey
Christian Potenza as Uncle Stephen
Addison Holley as Haley
AJ Bridel as Chloe
Drew Murphy as Sally Parker

Reception
Donna Wolfe of The Dove Foundation gave the film a positive review and wrote, "This is a heartwarming tale about a family and a dog discovering the special friendship between people and animals. Filled with comedy from Chevy Chase as grandpa and Tom Arnold as the dogcatcher, the entire family will have a great time viewing this Christmas film."

See also
List of Christmas films

References

External links
 
 

2010s English-language films
2014 films
Canadian Christmas comedy films
2010s Christmas comedy films
English-language Canadian films
Films about dogs
2010s Canadian films